The Anniversary Days Observance Act (22 Vict. c. 2; formal long title An Act to repeal certain Acts and Parts of Acts which relate to the Observance of the Thirtieth of January and other Days) was an Act of the Parliament of the United Kingdom which repealed several laws mandating "political services" or "state services": observance by the Church of England and Church of Ireland of certain anniversaries from 17th-century political history.

Provisions
The laws and observances abolished were specified by various Acts of the Parliament of England, Parliament of Great Britain, or Parliament of Ireland. These acts were repealed in full where they had no other purpose than establishing the relevant observance, and otherwise repealed only in relation to the observance.

Legislative history
The political and religious aspects of Anglican identity began to separate after Catholic emancipation culminated in the Roman Catholic Relief Act 1829. In the 1850s, moves to increased religious toleration included the Liberty of Religious Worship Act 1855 and the Jews Relief Act 1858. These changes were reflected in June and July 1858, when the House of Lords and House of Commons respectively passed resolutions making loyal addresses to Queen Victoria to remove certain "occasional forms of prayer" from the 1662 Book of Common Prayer. These prayers were re-specified by royal warrant after each new monarch's accession. The Crown agreed to consider the matter.

After some delay for legal advice, on 17 January 1859 the queen issued a new warrant removing the prayers. However, the observances which the prayers fulfilled were mandated by various Acts of Parliament; so a bill, initially called the Occasional Forms of Prayer Bill, was introduced in February 1859 to repeal the provisions which were no longer being enforced. Whereas the 1858 petitions had related only to observances in the English Book of Common Prayer, the 1859 bill additionally deleted the 23 October prayer from the Irish Book of Common Prayer. In the House of Lords the bill was renamed the Anniversary Days Observance Bill. It received royal assent on 25 March.

The 1859 act was itself repealed as spent by the Statute Law Revision Act 1875.

Criticism
In the House of Lords, the 1858 resolution was supported by most bishops; John Bird Sumner Archbishop of Canterbury and Archibald Campbell Tait, Samuel Wilberforce and Robert Daly (bishops of London, of Oxford, and of Cashel respectively) spoke in favour, while Christopher Bethell Bishop of Bangor opposed it. The Anglo-Catholic liturgist Vernon Staley in 1907 described the deletions as ultra vires because they were done without first obtaining the consent of the Convocations of Canterbury and York; he called them "a distinct violation of the compact between Church and Realm, as set forth in the Act of Uniformity which imposed the Book of Common Prayer in 1662".

See also
 Bank Holidays Act 1871

References

Sources
Primary
 
 
 
Secondary

Citations

Public holidays in the United Kingdom
United Kingdom Acts of Parliament 1859
Separation of church and state
Church of England festivals
Church of Ireland
Law about religion in the United Kingdom
Book of Common Prayer
Repealed United Kingdom Acts of Parliament